The Legendary Roy Orbison is a greatest hits album by Roy Orbison. It was released by Telstar Records in 1988 and reached number one on the UK Albums Chart in 1989, where it was a posthumous number one.

Track listing
Oh Pretty Woman
Only the Lonely
Love Hurts
Lana
My Prayer
Goodnight
Falling
Blue Angel
All I Have to Do Is Dream
In Dreams
Crying
Blue Bayou
Dream Baby (How Long Must I Dream)
The Great Pretender
Running Scared
Borne on the Wind
Mean Woman Blues
Pretty Paper
The Crowd
It's Over

Charts

References

1988 greatest hits albums
Roy Orbison compilation albums